Roger Hugh Williams, CBE (born 22 January 1948) is a Welsh Liberal Democrat politician who was the Member of Parliament (MP) for Brecon and Radnorshire from 2001 to 2015.

Early life
Born in the town of Crickhowell, Williams studied at Christ College, Brecon, and Selwyn College, Cambridge. On graduating in Natural Sciences he returned to Breconshire becoming a livestock farmer on the family farm at Llanfilo. During the mid-1980s he was elected Chairman of the Brecon and Radnorshire branch of the National Farmers Union.

Political career
Williams joined the Labour Party in 1969, but left to join the SDP at the formation of the party in 1981, representing it and subsequently the Liberal Democrats on Powys County Council. In 1990, he was elected Chairman of Brecon Beacons National Park. At the 1999 Welsh Assembly election Williams contested Carmarthen West and South Pembrokeshire but finished a distant fifth.

In 2001, he was elected to represent the constituency of Brecon & Radnorshire, subsequently holding the seat with a majority of 751 following the retirement of fellow Liberal Democrat Richard Livsey. At the 2005 election, Williams was returned with an improved majority of 3,905. He served as Shadow Welsh Secretary in the Liberal Democrat Frontbench Team in the 2005-10 Parliament and was re-elected at the 2010 election with a majority of 3,747.

Williams was appointed Commander of the Order of the British Empire (CBE) in the 2013 New Years Honours List for public and political service.

In 2017, he rejoined Powys County Council, winning the seat of Felin-fach.

Personal life
He married Penelope James in 1973 in Devon. They have a son (born 1975) and daughter (born 1976).

Footnotes

External links 
 Profile at the Liberal Democrats
 Profile at the Welsh Liberal Democrats
Brecon and Radnorshire Liberal Democrats

1948 births
Living people
People educated at Christ College, Brecon
Alumni of Selwyn College, Cambridge
People from Crickhowell
Councillors in Wales
Members of Powys County Council
Liberal Democrats (UK) MPs for Welsh constituencies
Social Democratic Party (UK) politicians
UK MPs 2001–2005
UK MPs 2005–2010
UK MPs 2010–2015
Commanders of the Order of the British Empire
Liberal Democrats (UK) councillors